USS Holly is a name used more than once by the U.S. Navy:

 , acquired by the US Navy in 1917 for service during World War I
 , a net laying ship placed in service at Algiers, Louisiana, 11 October 1941

See also 
 , a schooner purchased in 1861.
 , a wood and steel lighthouse tender built in 1881.

References 

United States Navy ship names